De Francesco (or de Francesco) is an Italian surname. Notable people with this surname include:

 Alberto De Francesco (born 1994), Italian football player
 Devlin DeFrancesco (born 2000), Canadian-Italian auto racing driver
 Francesco De Francesco (born 1977), Italian football striker
 Joey DeFrancesco (1971–2022), American jazz organist, trumpeter, saxophonist, and occasional singer
 John DeFrancesco (born 1940), American jazz organist and vocalist
 Johnny DeFrancesco (born 1965), merican blues guitarist
 Sebastian de Francesco (born 1981), Italian football striker 
 Matteuccia de Francesco (died 1428), an alleged Italian witch and nun
 Tony DeFrancesco (born 1963), American baseball coach

See also 
 Francesco
 Di Francesco

Italian-language surnames
Patronymic surnames
Surnames from given names